SpeedZone may refer to:

 SpeedZone (video game), a 2009 video game
 SpeedZone (amusement park), a family entertainment center franchise
 Speed Zone, a 1989 film